Constantine I (Konstantine I Mukhranbatoni) ( – 1667) was a Georgian prince and the head of the Mukhrani branch of the royal Bagrationi dynasty of Kartli. He was Prince (Mukhranbatoni) of Mukhrani and ex officio commander of the Banner of Shida Kartli from 1658 to 1667. 

Constantine I was the second son of Teimuraz I, by his wife Ana, daughter of Nugzar, Duke of Aragvi of the House of Sidamoni. He was born between 1618 and 1622. In 1658, Constantine succeeded as Prince of Mukhrani his elder brother Vakhtang, who became King of Kartli on the death of his adopted father, Rostom, the last in the main male line of the Bagrationi of Kartli. On this occasion, Vakhtang, as a vassal of Safavid Persia, converted to Islam, but Constantine remained Christian. He is buried at the Cathedral of Mtskheta.      

Constantine married Darejan, daughter of Prince Ghuana Abashidze (died 1667) and had the following children:
 Teimuraz II (1649–1688), Prince of Mukhrani.
 Papua (1651 – February 1717), Prince of Mukhrani.
 Davit (1667 – 5 November 1728). His only known daughter, Darejan, married Prince Parsadan Tsitsishvili.
 Erekle (1666–1723), Prince of Mukhrani.
 Kristepore (fl. 1683 – 1700), Archbishop.
 Tatia (fl. 1661–1664), second wife of Bagrat V of Imereti.
 Tamar (died 1683), married, successively, Levan III Dadiani, Prince of Mingrelia, then Bagrat V of Imereti, her sister's former husband, and, finally, Giorgi III Gurieli, Prince of Guria and sometime King of Imereti.

References

Year of birth unknown
1667 deaths
House of Mukhrani
17th-century people from Georgia (country)